This is a list of diplomatic missions of Bahrain, excluding honorary consulates.

Africa

 Algiers (Embassy)

 Cairo (Embassy)

 Rabat (Embassy)
Laayoune (Consulate-General)

 Khartoum (Embassy)

 Tunis (Embassy)

Americas

 Brasília (Embassy) 

 Washington D.C. (Embassy)

Asia

 Beijing (Embassy)

 New Delhi (Embassy)
 Mumbai (Consulate-General)

 Jakarta (Embassy) 

 Baghdad (Embassy)
 Najaf (Consulate-General)

 Tel Aviv (Embassy)

 Tokyo (Embassy)

 Amman (Embassy)

 Kuwait City (Embassy)

 Kuala Lumpur (Embassy)

 Muscat (Embassy)

 Islamabad (Embassy)
 Karachi (Consulate-General)

 Riyadh (Embassy)
 Jeddah (Consulate-General)

 Damascus (Embassy)

 Bangkok (Embassy)

 Ankara (Embassy)

 Abu Dhabi (Embassy)
 Dubai (Consulate-General)

Europe

 Brussels (Embassy)

 Paris (Embassy)

 Berlin (Embassy)

 Rome (Embassy)

 Moscow (Embassy)

 London (Embassy)

Multilateral organizations
 
 Brussels (Mission)
 
 Cairo (Permanent Mission)
 
 Geneva (Permanent Mission to the United Nations and other international organizations)
 New York City (Permanent Mission)

Embassy to open

 Belgrade (Embassy)

Gallery

See also
Foreign relations of Bahrain

References

External links
 Ministry of Foreign Affairs of Bahrain

 
Bahrain
Diplomatic missions